Sinful (Spanish: El pecador) is a 1965 Mexican film. It was the last film in which Pina Pellicer acted and was released after her death one year before on 4 December 1964.

Plot 
Mario, a law professor at the UNAM, known for his impeccable ethics, professionalism, widower and father of Irma, rejects the constant flirtations that his young student Lidia proposes to him. At a surprise party that his daughter throws for his birthday, he ends up getting drunk and goes straight to a cabaret where he falls in love with a prostitute named Olga, who is in a “toxic relationship” with his pimp and also drug trafficker, César Domínguez. On the other hand, her friend Sonia, also a prostitute, lies to a man named Víctor telling him that she is a nurse so that he does not leave her. Both women develop a love story with their respective lover, while trying to get out of prostitution and crime.

Cast 
 Arturo de Córdova as Mario
 Marga López as Olga
 Joaquín Cordero as César Domínguez
 Pina Pellicer as Irma
 Javier Solís as Víctor
 Ramón Valdés as Juan / mesero
 Kitty de Hoyos as Sonia
 Julissa as Lidia 
 Marco Antonio Muñiz as Bruno 
 Maura Monti as César's blonde lover (uncredited)

References

1965 films
Mexican crime drama films
1960s Spanish-language films
1960s Mexican films
Mexican musical drama films